Paradox (stylized ParaDOX) is Nanase Aikawa's second album. The album reached No. 1 on Oricon weekly album charts, and sold over a million copies, as certified by the RIAJ.

Track listing

References

1997 albums
Avex Group albums
Nanase Aikawa albums